This is the discography of Christina Stürmer.

Albums

Studio albums

Live albums

Compilation albums

Singles

References

External links
 
 

Discographies of Austrian artists
Rock music discographies